The New England Black Wolves are a lacrosse team based in Uncasville, Connecticut playing in the National Lacrosse League (NLL). The 2015 season is the debut season of the New England team after 28 years as the Philadelphia Wings.

Regular season

Current standings

Game log

Roster

Transactions

Trades

Entry Draft
The 2014 NLL Entry Draft took place on September 22, 2014. The Black Wolves made the following selections:

See also
2015 NLL season

References

New England Black Wolves seasons
New England Black Wolves
New England Black Wolves